GREE (derived from an abbreviation of the "Six degrees of separation" concept) is a Japanese social networking service founded by Yoshikazu Tanaka and operated by GREE, Inc.

GREE focuses primarily on mobile games and over ninety percent of its users access the site via their mobile phones. The company makes money by selling virtual goods to users such as clothes for their in-game avatars.

Social networking features of GREE include the user profile, diary, communities, photo sharing and photo emailing. It serves as a platform for promoting communication and mutual understanding among its members.

While GREE was initially available only to PC users, the service was later extended to feature phone users. GREE for feature phones includes regular social networking functions, social games, flash-based games, blogs, fortune telling, news and so forth. In 2010, GREE, Inc. started GREE for iPhone and Android to meet demand. GREE, Inc. provides a variety of social game applications for feature phones and smartphones, with enhanced communication among users. The source of earnings is mainly composed of advertisement sales and paid services sales.

Etymology
The service name GREE comes from a hypothesis, Six Degrees of Separation postulated by social psychologist Stanley Milgram in 1967. Six degrees of separation is a hypothesis that everyone is at most six steps away from any other person on Earth. If a chain of a friend of a friend statements are made, any two people in the world can be connected in six steps or fewer.
The name symbolizes GREE’s hope to create and provide any new possibilities of the Internet.

See also
Ensemble Girls!

References

External links
 Official GREE website

Japanese social networking websites
Mobile social software
Internet properties established in 2004
2004 establishments in Japan